Bo Kluea is a district (amphoe) in the eastern part of Nan province, northern Thailand.

History

The minor district (king amphoe) Bo Kluea was established on 5 February 1988 by splitting the two tambons Bo Kluea Nuea and Bo Kluea Tai from Pua district. It was upgraded to a full district on 7 September 1995.

Geography
Neighboring districts are from the south clockwise Mae Charim, Santi Suk, Pua and Chaloem Phra Kiat of Nan Province. To the east is Xaignabouli of Laos.

The district is in the Luang Prabang Range mountain area of the Thai highlands.

Economy
The district is known for its ancient salt wells from which salt is produced from the evaporation of brine.

Administration
The district is divided into four sub-districts (tambons), which are further subdivided into 39 villages (mubans). There are no municipal (thesaban) areas, and four tambon administrative organizations (TAO).

The missing number 3 belongs to tambon Khun Nan which is now part of Chaloem Phra Kiat District.

References

External links
amphoe.com

Bo Kluea